The firebrat (Thermobia domestica) is a small hexapod (typically 1–1.5 cm),  in the order Zygentoma.

Habitat 

Firebrats prefer higher temperatures and require some humidity, and can be found in bakeries and near boilers or furnaces. They feed on a wide variety of carbohydrates and starches that are also protein sources such as dog food, flour and book bindings. They are distributed throughout most parts of the world and are normally found outdoors under rocks, leaf litter, and in similar environments, but are also often found indoors where they are considered pests. They do not cause major damage, but they can contaminate food, damage paper goods, and stain clothing. Otherwise they are mostly harmless.

Behavior

Firebrats utilize pheromones to lead other firebrats to attract one another and congregate. To maintain a group, firebrats must remain in contact with one another (Tremblay MN & Gries G, 2003).

Breeding

At 1.5 to 4.5 months of age the female firebrat begins laying eggs if the temperature is right (32–41 °C or 90–106 °F). It may lay up to 6000 eggs in a lifetime of about 3–5 years. After incubation (12–13 days), the nymphs hatch. They may reach maturity in as little as 2–4 months, resulting in several generations each year.

Meiosis

The sequential changes occurring during the prophase I stage of meiosis in T. domestica ovaries have been described in detail.

References

External links
 Silverfish and Firebrats, Kansas State University (via archive.org)

Lepismatidae
Insects described in 1873